Dark Tranquillity is a Swedish melodic death metal band from Gothenburg. They are considered one of the pioneering acts of the Gothenburg metal scene, which also includes bands such as In Flames and At the Gates. Dark Tranquillity is regarded as the Gothenburg fathers in the film entitled Out of Nothing: A DT Documentary released by Century Media, which was filmed in their home town in April 2009.

Background

Early years and Skydancer (1989–1993)
Dark Tranquillity was formed in 1989 by current vocalist and then-guitarist Mikael Stanne, and guitarist Niklas Sundin, under the name Septic Broiler. Three additional members, Anders Fridén, Anders Jivarp and Martin Henriksson, later joined the line-up.

In 1990, the band recorded a demo entitled Enfeebled Earth before changing their name to Dark Tranquillity, which featured a largely thrash metal-influenced style of death metal, comparable to early Death. After releasing another demo entitled Rehearsal December 1990, the band changed its name to Dark Tranquillity, and released multiple demos, including Trail of Life Decayed in 1991 and A Moonclad Reflection in 1992, which both showed a progression into the more melodic nuances of death metal that the band would explore on their later studio releases.

In August 1993, the band released their debut album Skydancer. Soon after, vocalist Anders Fridén left the band and joined fellow Gothenburg band, In Flames. Guitarist Mikael Stanne then assumed the position of lead vocalist, and Fredrik Johansson was recruited to take over guitar duties.

The Gallery and Of Chaos and Eternal Night (1994–1995)
In 1994, Dark Tranquillity covered the song "My Friend of Misery" for the Metallica tribute album Metal Militia − A Tribute to Metallica.

In 1995, the band released an EP, Of Chaos and Eternal Night, which was later followed by the release of their second studio album, The Gallery. The Gallery has been referred to as a masterpiece from the era.

The Mind's I (1996–1998)
Dark Tranquillity released their second EP, Enter Suicidal Angels, in November 1996. Their third album, The Mind's I, was released in April 1997, with the band continuing further with the sound conveyed on The Gallery.

Projector, lineup changes and a different sound (1999)

In January 1999, Fredrik Johansson and the band parted ways. Johansson's desire to focus on fatherhood and hold a day job, rather than dealing with the uncertainties of the music industry was incompatible with the band's need for a reliable guitarist. With that position now vacant, bassist Martin Henriksson, who was a little reluctant to do so, took over duties as guitarist, and the band brought in Michael Niklasson on bass. Projector saw the introduction of a lot of piano, keyboard, and electronic parts into Dark Tranquillity's sound, so the band also added another member, Martin Brändström, on keyboards.  With this new lineup, the band played live bonus tracks of the reissue of this album and filmed a music video for "ThereIn".

Projector was released in June 1999, and was later nominated for a Swedish Grammy Award. The album saw a major change in songwriting: while retaining growled vocals and their signature death metal sound, the band added pianos, baritone soft vocals, and verse-chorus fashion to their sound, reflecting the band's goal to strive for different musical expressions. Around the same time, Skydancer and Of Chaos and Eternal Night were reissued together as Skydancer/Of Chaos and Eternal Night.

Haven (2000)
A year later saw the release of Haven, which featured prominent electronics in comparison to previous releases. Like its predecessor, Haven was also received in a generally mixed manner by fans and critics alike.

As the band toured in 2001, the band hired Robin Engström to play live, due to Jivarp's commitments as a new father.

Damage Done and Exposures − In Retrospect and Denial (2001–2004)
Dark Tranquillity released Damage Done in 2002, was a return to a much heavier direction, adding thicker guitar distortion, deep atmospheric keyboards, and abandoning soft vocals altogether.  They released the music video for the single "Monochromatic Stains", followed by their release of Live Damage, their first live DVD. In 2004, their compilation album Exposures – In Retrospect and Denial, featuring one disc with rare and unreleased tracks and another with live tracks, was released.

Character (2005)
Character was the seventh release from Dark Tranquillity, released in 2005, and was held in much critical praise. It featured the fourth music video released by Dark Tranquillity, with the successful single "Lost to Apathy". After releasing the album, the band played live in Canada for the first time.

Fiction (2006–2009)

In 2007, Fiction was released, which in turn, saw a return of Stanne's clean vocals, and the first female guest vocalist since Projector. The album also saw writing style that combined the stylings of Projector and Haven, with the more aggressive traits of Character and Damage Done. At this time, Dark Tranquillity toured with The Haunted, Into Eternity, and Scar Symmetry for the North America Metal for the Masses Tour. They also toured the UK in early 2008 along with Omnium Gatherum. They returned to the US during spring 2008 with Arch Enemy. On the band's official website they announced that bass guitarist Niklasson left the band in August 2008 due to personal reasons with no hard feelings between him and the band. On 19 September 2008, the band found a new bassist in Dimension Zero guitarist Daniel Antonsson, who also was a guitarist for Soilwork.

On 25 May 2009, reissues of Projector, Haven, and Damage Done were released.

We Are the Void (2010–2011)
On 14 October 2009, Dark Tranquillity finished work on their ninth studio album. On 26 October 2009, they released a DVD titled Where Death Is Most Alive. On 30 October 2009, at the release party of the DVD, 333 copies were given away for free of the rare live album The Dying Fragments. On 21 December 2009, Dark Tranquillity released the song "Dream Oblivion", and on 14 January 2010, they released the song "At the Point of Ignition", from their ninth album, exclusively on their MySpace page. Their ninth album, titled We Are the Void, was released on 1 March 2010 in Europe and 2 March in the US. They were also the opening act for a US winter tour that was headlined by Killswitch Engage and joined by The Devil Wears Prada.

Dark Tranquillity headlined a North American tour in May–June 2010 with Threat Signal, Mutiny Within and The Absence. In February 2011, the band performed live at BITS Pilani Hyderabad Campus in Hyderabad, India.

Construct (2012–2013)
On 27 April 2012, Dark Tranquillity renewed their contract with Century Media. On 18 October 2012, the band began writing for the album. On 10 January 2013, the band announced the title of their tenth album would be Construct, and it was released in Europe on 27 May 2013 and in North America on 28 May 2013. The album was mixed by Jens Bogren at his Fascination Street studios in Örebro, Sweden.

On 18 February 2013, Antonsson amicably left Dark Tranquillity, citing a desire to focus on playing guitar and being a recording engineer and producer. On 27 February 2013, the band announced that they completed recording the album. Although Antonsson remained during the recording of "Construct", he did not perform the bass. According to Niklas Sundin's Twitter, he hasn't been excited for a Dark Tranquillity release since Skydancer, due to the fact that the recording sessions for all their other releases were "way too long" compared to Construct.

On 27 March 2013, a teaser campaign and track list for Construct were revealed. The band also commented on the style of the album, saying, "While still bearing the unmistakable mark of the Dark Tranquillity, the record is probably our most different and diverse offering since 1999's Projector".

To promote the album, the band toured the world with dates in Finland and North America alongside Omnium Gatherum, Europe with Tristania, and Sweden with Darkane.

On 10 July 2013, a B-side from Construct, titled "Sorrow's Architect", was released on a limited flexi 7" released with an issue of Decibel. On 14 January 2014, the band announced that the song would be released with another B-side, titled "A Memory Construct", on a limited tour 7" and digitally which also includes the "Sorrow's Architect". The 7" became available on 1 February 2014, and digitally in March 2014.

Atoma (2014–2018)
In March 2016, guitarist Martin Henriksson announced his departure from the band, admitting he had "lost the passion for playing music" after playing in the band for 26 years. The band had no hard feelings for him and wished him the best in whatever he decided to pursue. 

On 22 May 2016, Dark Tranquillity began recording their eleventh full-length album Atoma, but did not officially announce it until 6 July. The album was finally released on 4 November 2016, via Century Media. In March 2017, the band released the song "The Absolute", which was recorded during the Atoma sessions, as a digital single. On 28 January 2018, Dark Tranquillity embarked on a European tour with main support band Equilibrium.

Lineup changes and Moment (2019–present)
On 29 June 2019, Mikael Stanne said in an interview that the band is "gathering material and starting the pre-production process" for their twelfth studio album. On 22 March 2020, Niklas Sundin released a statement on Dark Tranquillity's social media, announcing his departure from the band. A week later the band announced that the recording of their new album had started, and that the two guitarists who had been touring with the band, since 2017, Christopher Amott and Johan Reinholdz were named full-time members of the band. The album, Moment, was released on 20 November 2020. As a preview, they released the singles "Phantom Days", "Identical to None", "The Dark Unbroken" and "Eyes Of The World" on September 11th, October 16th, October 30th and on November 20th 2020, respectively. Moment was awarded the 2021 Grammi for Hard Rock/Metal Album of the Year.

On 13 August 2021, Mikael Stanne announced the departure of longtime original drummer Anders Jivarp and bassist Anders Iwers. For their upcoming tour bassist Christian Jansson and In Mourning drummer Joakim Strandberg Nilsson were asked to play as session musicians. In 2022 both of them have become full-time band members.

On 25 January 2022 former guitarist Fredrik Johansson has died in cancer.

Band members

Current members
Mikael Stanne – vocals (1994–present), rhythm guitar (1989–1994) 
Martin Brändström – keyboards, programming (1999–present) 
Christopher Amott – lead guitar (2020–present; live 2017–2020)
Johan Reinholdz – rhythm guitar (2020–present; live 2017–2020)
Christian Jansson – bass (2022–present; live 2021–2022)
Joakim Strandberg Nilsson – drums (2022–present; live 2021–2022)

Former members
Anders Jivarp – drums (1989–2021)
Niklas Sundin – lead guitar (1989–2020; hiatus 2016–2020), rhythm guitar (2016–2020; hiatus 2016–2020)
Martin Henriksson – bass (1989–1999, 2013–2015), rhythm guitar (1999–2016)
Anders Fridén – vocals (1989–1994)
Fredrik Johansson – rhythm guitar (1994–1999; died 2022)
Mikael Niklasson – bass (1999–2008)
Daniel Antonsson – bass (2008–2013)
Anders Iwers – bass (2015–2021)

Former live members
Robin Engström – drums (2001)
Erik Jacobsson –  rhythm guitar (2015–2016)
Jens Florén – rhythm guitar (2016)
Sebastian Myrèn – rhythm guitar (2016–2017)
Mike Bear – bass (2022)
Joey Concepcion – lead guitar (2022)

Timeline

Discography

Skydancer (1993)
The Gallery (1995)
The Mind's I (1997)
Projector (1999)
Haven (2000)
Damage Done (2002)
Character (2005)
Fiction (2007)
We Are the Void (2010)
Construct (2013)
Atoma (2016)
Moment (2020)

References

External links

 Official website
 
 
 

 
1989 establishments in Sweden
Century Media Records artists
Musical groups established in 1989
Spinefarm Records artists
Swedish melodic death metal musical groups
Swedish heavy metal musical groups